Ctena is a genus of bivalves belonging to the family Lucinidae.

The genus has a cosmopolitan distribution.

Species
The following species are recognised in the genus Ctena:
 

Ctena bella 
Ctena decussata 
Ctena delicatula 
Ctena divergens 
Ctena eburnea 
Ctena galapagana 
Ctena gunnamatta 
Ctena imbricatula 
Ctena mexicana 
Ctena orbiculata 
Ctena reevei 
Ctena tatei

References

Lucinidae
Bivalve genera